Alpha Pictoris (α Pic, α Pictoris) is the brightest star in the southern constellation of Pictor. It has an apparent visual magnitude of 3.27, which is bright enough to be viewed from urban areas in the southern hemisphere. Alpha Pictoris has the distinction of being the south pole star of the planet Mercury.

Properties
With an estimated age of 660 million years, this is a relatively young Lambda Boötis star. The stellar classification of  shows this peculiarity, with the kA6 notation  indicating weaker than normal calcium K-lines in the spectrum. The 'n' following the main sequence luminosity class of V indicates the absorption lines in the spectrum are broad and nebulous. This is caused by the rapid spin of the star, which has a high projected rotational velocity of 206 km/s. Spectroscopy shows narrow, time-varying absorption features being caused by circumstellar gas moving toward the star. This is not the result of interstellar matter, but a shell of gas along the orbital plane. Alpha Pictoris is categorized as a rapidly rotating shell star that may have recently ejected mass from its outer atmosphere.

Alpha Pictoris is larger than the Sun, with twice the mass and a 60% greater radius. At this heat, the star glows with the white hue of an A-type star. The space velocity components of this star in the galactic coordinate system are U = -22, V = -20 and W = -9 km/s.

Data from the Hipparcos mission indicate this may be an unresolved binary system with a companion orbiting at a semimajor axis of around 1 AU, or the same distance that the Earth orbits from the Sun. Alpha Pictoris is an X-ray source, which is unusual for an A-type star since stellar models don't predict them to have magnetic dynamos. This emission may instead be originating from the companion.

References

Pictor (constellation)
A-type main-sequence stars
0248
2550
032607
050241
Durchmusterung objects
Southern pole stars